Kapas Island (Terengganuan: Pula Kapah) is an island in Marang District, Terengganu, Malaysia, with a smaller island, Pulau Gemia, located north of it. Its name, Pulau Kapas (Malay for cotton island), refers to the island's white beaches. The island has tropical jungle, clear seawater, white sand beaches and coral reefs in the surrounding waters. It is promoted as a "diving and snorkeling paradise". The island is reached by ferry from Marang.
Kapas is the location where most of the research on the enigmatic Amphidromus snails is carried out (unlike all other snails, Amphidromus are amphidromine: they usually exist of clockwise and anticlockwise individuals).

See also
List of islands of Malaysia
List of islands in the South China Sea

References

External links

 Tourism Malaysia - Pulau Kapas
 

Islands of Terengganu
Marang District